Yūsuke Kobayashi may refer to:

Yūsuke Kobayashi (voice actor) (born 1985), Japanese voice actor
Yusuke Kobayashi (footballer, born 1983) (小林 優希), Japanese footballer
Yusuke Kobayashi (footballer, born 1994) (小林 祐介), Japanese footballer
Yūsuke Kobayashi (judoka) (born 1993), Japanese judoka